"Solid Gold" is a song performed by Dionne Warwick, composed by Michael K. Miller, lyrics by Dean Pitchford. It is the official theme song of the 1980s TV music show Solid Gold.

Warwick also performed "Solid Gold" on The Tonight Show on June 25, 1981.

The lyrics of the opening verse encapsulate the spirit of both the song and the show:

The music has magic,
You know you can catch it;
If you let the songs take control...

The sound starts to glisten,
The more that you listen,
And slowly it turns into gold...

References

External links
 Lyrics of this song
 

Music television series theme songs
Songs written by Dean Pitchford
Dionne Warwick songs
1980 songs
Songs about music